At Home Alone Together is an Australian comedy series which is a satire of lifestyle television in the era of lockdowns, self-isolation and social distancing as a result of the COVID-19 pandemic in Australia. The nine part series was produced by the ABC with production investment from the ABC and Screen Australia.

Premise
At Home Alone Together is a satirical comedy described as a lifestyle television shows for a world in which nobody has a life.

Cast
Hosted by journalist Ray Martin, it features regular contributors, including comedians Anne Edmonds, Ryan Shelton, Becky Lucas, Bjorn Stewart, Christiaan Van Vuuren and Adele Vuko, who share their knowledge, inspirations and advice on how to achieve self-improvement. Additional contributors include Father Bob Maguire, Laura Hughes, Michelle Brasier, Dr Norman Swan, Lucy Durack and Tim Hewitt.

Guest Appearances
Guests on the sketch show appear as themselves or as characters in sketches. Guests include: Craig Reucassel, Deborah Mailman, Adam Liaw, Andrew Denton, Anthony Callea, Cameron James, Cameron Duggan, Cathy Freeman, G Flip, Costa Georgiadis, Jennifer Byrne, Joe Hildebrand, Leigh Sales, Mark Humphries, Matt Moran, Michala Banas, Osher Gunsberg, Peter FitzSimons, Ryan 'Fitzy' Fitzgerald, Sam Campbell, Tim Campbell, Tim Lancaster, Toby Truslove, Yaraman Thorne.

See also
Life Support
 Get Krack!n

References

External links
 
 Official website 

2020 Australian television series debuts
2020 Australian television series endings
Australian Broadcasting Corporation original programming
Australian comedy television series
Television shows about the COVID-19 pandemic